Swatantra 2014 (from the Indic word Swatantra meaning 'independent', or 'free' as in 'free will') was the fifth international free software conference organized by the International Centre for Free and Open Source Software (ICFOSS), an autonomous organization set up by the Government of Kerala, India for the propagation of FOSS. It was held in Thiruvananthapuram, Kerala, India during 18–20 December 2014. Among supporting organizations of the conference were the Free Software Foundation of India, Centre for Internet and Society (India), Software Freedom Law Center (India) and Swathantra Malayalam Computing.

Objective

According to Satish Babu, Director, ICFOSS, free software is capable of offering a freedom-enhancing, robust and reliable alternative, with additional economic advantages, compared to proprietary software, and therefore that free software could find application in the public and private sector organizations in the field of, inter alia, education, arts, and culture.

Event 

The theme of the event was "Free Software for a Free World".  Over 200 delegates attended the conference. The inaugural speech was delivered by Richard Stallman, founder of the free software movement who was of the view that this software should enable access without compromising the security of one's identity. He also told that cameras installed on streets was a threat to the privacy of the public.

Other than Stallman, notable personalities like Smári McCarthy and Nina Paley attended the event.

Prof. Rahul De of IIM Bangalore, a speaker at the event, reported during his presentation that over  could be saved in India, if free software was used for ICT in Education in the 320,000 schools across the country.

Sessions 
The following parallel sessions were held:
 Indian Language Computing
 Wikipedia/Wikimedia activities
 Computational Biology & Sciences
 Free Culture
 Freedom on the Cloud
 Free Mobile Platforms
 Education & Spoken Tutorials
 Surveillance, security and privacy & Internet Governance
 Mapping & OpenStreetMaps
 Computing for the Differently-abled
 Free Software in e-Governance
 Open Hardware & IoT

Supporting organizations 
The following are the organizations that supported the event:

 Centre for Internet and Society
 SFLC.IN, Delhi
 Swathanthra Malayalam Computing
 FOSSEE, IIT-Bombay
 SPACE, Thiruvananthapuram
 Department of Computational Biology and Bioinformatics, Kerala University, Thiruvananthapuram
 Spoken Tutorials, IIT-Bombay
 IEEE Kerala Section

References

External links 

 

2014 in India
Free software culture and documents
Software industry in India
Science and technology in Thiruvananthapuram